The 2019 CollegeInsider.com Postseason Tournament (CIT) was a postseason single-elimination tournament of NCAA Division I basketball teams. The tournament began on March 18, 2019, and concluded on April 4, 2019.

Participating teams
The following teams received an invitation to the 2019 CIT:
Note: Team records are before playing in the tournament

Seeds
The top three seeds remaining after the first round received byes to the quarterfinals.
Marshall received the number 1 seed. Louisiana-Monroe and NJIT also received byes to the quarterfinals after winning their first round matchup.

Declined invitations 
The following programs declined an invitation to play in the CIT.

 Bowling Green
 BYU
 Fresno State
 Hawaii
 Jacksonville State
 San Francisco
 Texas-San Antonio

Schedule
Note: Top 3 seeds will get a bye after first round

Bracket
Bracket is for visual purposes only. The CIT does not use a set bracket.

Home teams listed second.
* Denotes overtime period.

References

External links
CollegeInsider.com Postseason Tournament

CollegeInsider.com
CollegeInsider.com Postseason Tournament